Neotropidion is a genus of beetles in the family Cerambycidae, containing the following species:

 Neotropidion nodicolle (Dalman, 1823)
 Neotropidion pulchellum Martins, 1968

References

Ibidionini